Tú No Te Imaginas (English: "You Don't Imagine") is a song by Peruvian singer-songwriter Gian Marco released by Enjoymusic as the second single of his thirteenth studio album Intuición. A Bachata version of the song is included on the album and a Bachata remix version featuring Costa Rican singer Debi Nova was released on December 3, 2018.

Release and reception
The song was released on September 15, 2018 on all digital platforms and a video was released on Gian Marco's official YouTube channel as the second single from his album Intuición and the last on to be released before the album. The song became known as one of Gian Marco's biggest hits. It is considered as one of the best songs from the album.

Music video
The video for the song was released on the same day as the song.
The video starts with Gian Marco performing the song in a bar where a couple meet and start a relationship. The video then follows the couple as their relationship starts to struggle. A music video for the Bachata remix featuring Devi Nova was released on December 3, 2018. The video features Gian Marco and Debi Nova in a studio singing the song acoustically while Gian Marco plays the guitar.

Charts

Weekly charts

Year-end charts

References

Gian Marco songs
2018 singles
Spanish-language songs
2018 songs
Songs written by Gian Marco